Syngamia latimarginalis is a moth in the family Crambidae. It was described by Francis Walker in 1859. It is found in Sri Lanka, India, Myanmar, Indonesia (Java), Taiwan, the Democratic Republic of the Congo (Katanga), Equatorial Guinea, Kenya and Mozambique.

References

Moths described in 1859
Spilomelinae